XIX World Rhythmic Gymnastics Championships were held in Vienna, the capital of Austria, September 20–24, 1995.

Medal winners

Participants
The following countries sent competitor(s) Argentina, Australia, Austria, Azerbaijan, Belgium, Belarus, Brazil, Bulgaria, Canada, China, Croatia, Cyprus, Czech Republic, Estonia, Finland, France,  Georgia, Germany, Greece, Hungary, Israel, Italy, Japan, Kazakhstan, Lithuania, Moldova, The Netherlands, New Zealand, Norway, Poland, Portugal, Romania, Russia, Slovakia, Slovenia, South Korea, Spain, Sweden, Thailand, Turkmenistan, Ukraine, The United Kingdom and USA

Individual
 Alejandra Unsain, Cecilia Schtutman
 Kasumi Takahashi, Leigh Marning
 Birgit Schilien, Nina Taborsky
 Natalya Bulanova, Alfia Kukshinova, Nurdjahan Aliyeva
 Larissa Lukyanenko, Evgenia Pavlina
 Cindy Stollenberg, Lorrie Degroote, Isabelle Massage
 Camila Ferezin, Luciana Barichello, Dayane Camillo da Silva
 Maria Petrova, Diana Popova
 Erika-Leigh Stirton, Lindsay Richards, Gretchen McLennan
 Xiaojing Zhou, Wu Bei
 Ana Cerovec, Kristina Bajza, Josipa Jurinec
 Panaiyota Kimonos, Popi Sofocleous
 Lenka Oulehlova, Andrea Sebestova
 Natalja Kornysheva, Jekaterina Gorgul
 Katri Kalpala, Hanna Laiho
 Eva Serrano, Amélie Villeneuve
 Magdalena Brzeska, Kristin Sroka
 Ekaterina Abramia, Ekaterina Pevkina
 Maria Pagalou, Victoria Gogou
 Viktoria Frater, Andrea Szalay
 Svetlana Tokayev, Sivan Fischler
 Katia Pietrosanti, Irene Germini, Laura Zacchilli
  Miho Yamada, Akane Yamao, Mutsuko Tahara
 Yulia Yourtchenko, Valeria Khairoulina, Lyudmila Popova
 Kristina Kliukevichute, Audrone Lingyte
 Natalia Fiodorova, Olga Vanitckina, Ella Dumbrava
 Lucinda Schuurman, Ramona Stook
 Simone Clark, Belinda Moore
 Marianne Myhrer, Siri Kjeksrud
 Anna Kwitniewska, Krystyna Leskiewicz
 Joana Raposo, Susana Nascimento
 Alina Stoica, Dana Carteleanu
 Yana Batyrshina, Natalia Lipkovskaya, Amina Zaripova
 Almudena Cid, Alba Caride-Costas
 Zuzana Dobiasova, Ivana Motolíková
 Nina Piletic, Erika Rakusa, Ana Kokalj
 Kim Yoo-Kyung, Kwon Bo-Young, Kim Eun-Hae
 Hanna Koehler
 Wannarudee Hansomboon, Yeansukon Aunchaya
 Tatyana Lobanova
 Ekaterina Serebrianskaya, Elena Vitrichenko, Victoria Stadnik
 Aicha McKenzie, Alison Deehan
 Jessica Davis, Tina Tharp

Individual

Individual All-Around

Individual Ball

Individual Rope

Individual Clubs

Individual Ribbon

Team All-Around

Groups

Groups All-Around

Groups 5 Hoops

Groups 3 Balls + 2 Ribbons

References

Results from site of FIG

Rhythmic Gymnastics World Championships
Rhythmic Gymnastics Championships
1995 in gymnastics
1995 in Austrian sport